The Spitfire of Seville is a 1919 American silent drama film directed by George Siegmann and starring Hedda Nova, Thurston Hall, and Claire Anderson.

Plot

Cast
 Hedda Nova as Carmelita Delgado 
 Thurston Hall as Kent Staunton 
 Claire Anderson as Alice Foster 
 Marian Skinner as Her Mother 
 François Dumas as Don Salvador 
 Leo D. Maloney as Pedro 
 Robert Gray as Leonardo 
 Edgar Allen as Romero

References

Bibliography
 Darby, William. Masters of Lens and Light: A Checklist of Major Cinematographers and Their Feature Films. Scarecrow Press, 1991.

External links

 

1919 films
1919 drama films
1910s English-language films
American silent feature films
Silent American drama films
Films directed by George Siegmann
American black-and-white films
Universal Pictures films
Films with screenplays by Joseph F. Poland
1910s American films